Laurence Doherty and Reginald Doherty defeated Harold Mahony and Major Ritchie 8–6, 6–2, 6–2 in the All Comers' Final, and then defeated the reigning champions Frank Riseley and Sydney Smith 6–4, 6–4, 6–4 in the challenge round to win the gentlemen's doubles tennis title at the 1903 Wimbledon Championships.

Draw

Challenge round

All comers' finals

Top half

Bottom half

References

External links

Gentlemen's Doubles
Wimbledon Championship by year – Men's doubles